Maclean Jones (born 12 June 1996) is an Australian rugby union player who plays as a number 8 for the Chicago Hounds in Major League Rugby (MLR).

He previously played for the Austin Gilgronis in the MLR.

References 

Australian rugby union players
1996 births
Living people
Rugby union flankers
Rugby union number eights
Queensland Country (NRC team) players
New South Wales Waratahs players
New South Wales Country Eagles players
Sydney (NRC team) players
Austin Gilgronis players
Chicago Hounds (rugby union) players